Shiraz Ali (born 28 June 1934) is a former Bermudian cricketer. He was born in Bermuda and was a right-handed batsman and a left-arm spin bowler. He played one first-class match for Bermuda, against New Zealand in 1972. It was the maiden first-class match to be played by the Bermuda cricket team.

References

External links
Cricket Archive profile

1934 births
Living people
Bermudian cricketers